Rainmaker is the second studio album released by the hard rock band Fair Warning.

Track listing
All songs written by Ule W. Ritgen except where noted.
 "The Heart of Summer" – 3:45
 "Don't Give Up" – 4:11 (Engelke)
 "Burning Heart" – 3:53
 "Rain Song" – 3:50
 "Get a Little Closer" – 4:16
 "Desert Song" – 6:48
 "What Did You Find" – 4:59 (Engelke)
 "Pictures of Love" – 4:40
 "Lonely Rooms" – 4:56 (Engelke)
 "One Way Up" – 3:32
 "Angel of Dawn" – 3:55
 "Stars and the Moon" – 4:11 (Helge Engelke)
 "Desolation Angels" – 3:37
 "The Call of the Wild - 3:48
 "Too Late For Love" – 4:02

Personnel
Tommy Heart – vocals 
Helge Engelke – guitars, keyboards and backing vocals
Andy Malecek – guitars
Ule W. Ritgen – bass guitar and backing vocals
C. C. Behrens – drums

External links
Heavy Harmonies page

Fair Warning (band) albums
1995 albums